The red-fronted barbet (Tricholaema diademata) is a species of bird in the Lybiidae family.
It is found in Ethiopia, Kenya, South Sudan, Tanzania, and Uganda.

References

red-fronted barbet
Birds of East Africa
red-fronted barbet
Taxa named by Theodor von Heuglin
Taxonomy articles created by Polbot